This surname has Anglo-Saxon pre-8th century origins; spelling variations include Albert, Albertson and Alberts in English names. It is derived from the Old German compound 'Aedelbeort' meaning 'noble-bright'. However, many sources show it as a French surname, with many spelling variations on the French form. It is now found in many locations of the world, spread by French Huguenot refugees, amongst others.

Notable people with this surname include the following:

 Abbé Aubert (1731–1814), French playwright, poet and journalist
 Louis Aubert (painter) (1720 – ), painter and composer
 Alexander Aubert, English merchant
 Alvin Aubert (1930–2014), American poet
 Anaïs Aubert, known as Mademoiselle Anaïs (1802–1871), French actress
 Andreas Aubert (art historian), Norwegian art historian
 Aristide Aubert Du Petit Thouars, French naval officer
 Arnaud Aubert,  Catholic Chamberlain
 Étienne Aubert, later became Pope Innocent VI
 Aubert of Avranches, bishop of Avranches
 Axel Aubert (1873–1943), Norwegian businessman
 Ebba d'Aubert, Swedish pianist
 François d'Aubert, French politician
 Hermann Rudolph Aubert, German physiologist
 Jacques Aubert (1689–1753), French composer and violinist
 Jean Aubert (architect) (–1741), French architect
 Jean Aubert (engineer) (1894–1984), French engineer
 Jean-Louis Aubert, French guitarist, singer and songwriter
 Jeanne Aubert, French singer and actress
 , French painter
 Julien Aubert (born 1978), French politician
 K. D. Aubert, American actress
 Louis Aubert, French composer
 Louis-Marie Aubert du Petit-Thouars, French botanist
 Ludvig Cæsar Martin Aubert, Norwegian philologist 
 Ludvig Mariboe Benjamin Aubert, Norwegian jurist and politician
 Marie-Hélène Aubert, French politician
 Phillipe-Ignace François Aubert de Gaspé, Canadian writer
 Philippe-Joseph Aubert de Gaspé, French Canadian writer and seigneur
 Pierre Aubert, Swiss politician
 Puig Aubert, French rugby league footballer
 Raphaël Aubert, Swiss writer and essayist
 Suzanne Aubert, Catholic sister
 Vilhelm Aubert, Norwegian sociologist
 Vilhelm Mariboe Aubert, Norwegian jurist

 Aubert (noble family), a noble family of Denmark and Norway

See also 
 
 Albert
 Aubèrt
 Aubertin

References

Surnames
Surnames of French origin
Surnames of English origin
Surnames of British Isles origin
French-language surnames
Surnames of Norman origin
Germanic-language surnames
Anglo-Saxon England